Bovina is a town in Outagamie County, Wisconsin,  United States. At the 2000 census, the town had a total population of 1,130. The village of Shiocton is located within the town.

Geography
According to the United States Census Bureau, the town has a total area of 33.7 square miles (87.4 km2), of which, 33.7 square miles (87.2 km2) of it is land and 0.1 square miles (0.2 km2) of it (0.18%) is water.

Demographics
At the 2020 census, there were 1,153 people and 402 households. There were 483 housing units. The racial makeup of the town was 1,078 White alone, 6 black or African descent alone, 1 American Indian, 11 Asian, 43 Hispanic, and 10 some other race alone.

With 402 households, 21.7% had children under the age of 18 living with them, 69.7% were married couples living together, 7.5% had a female householder with no husband present, and 16.7% had a male householder with no female present. 13.5% of all households were made up of individuals 65 or older. The average family size was 2.99.

The Median Household Income was $77,917 and the Employment Rate was at 62.0%. Approximately 18.5% of residents have a Bachelor's Degree or Higher.

Notable people

 Ervin Conradt, farmer and politician, was born in the town

References

Towns in Outagamie County, Wisconsin
Towns in Wisconsin